Stinus Lindgreen (born 9 August 1980 in Lyngby-Taarbæk) is a Danish scientist and politician, who is a member of the Folketing for the Social Liberal Party. He was elected into parliament at the 2019 election.

External links 
 Biography on the website of the Danish Parliament (Folketinget)

References

1980 births
Living people
People from Lyngby-Taarbæk Municipality
Danish Social Liberal Party politicians
Danish scientists
Members of the Folketing 2019–2022